Angkor Ban is a commune (khum) of Sampov Loun District in Battambang Province in northwestern Cambodia.

Villages

References

Communes of Battambang province
Sampov Loun District